Thazhathupurakkal Karunakara Panicker Rajeev Kumar (born 20 September 1961) is a National Award-winning Indian director of Malayalam films, from Trivandrum. He is the winner of five Kerala State Film Awards for Best Film, Director, Story Writer & Script Writer, a show director, theatre actor and percussionist (Mridangam). He is a founding member and leader of the musical band Blue Birds in 1980 and Super Mimics, a comedy show in 1979. He is also the Kerala University winner of Mono Act in the University Youth Festivals 1980–1982 and Kerala Sangeetha Nataka Academy winner for Mono Act 1979–1982.

Career

TK Rajeev Kumar was the chairman of Kerala State Chalachitra Academy from 2003 to 2006. He was also the director of IFFK International Film Festival of Kerala from 2003 to 2006 and was the vice-chairman of Kerala State Chalachitra Academy in 2002. He was nominated as jury chairman for Kerala State Film Awards 2007. He is a member of the Federation of Indian Chambers of Commerce & Industry (FICCI).
He is a member, general council, of the Film & Television Institute, Pune (2003–2008). He was the founding artistic director of JTPac, Kochi (Jose Thomas Performing Art Centre), now the artistic director of Blue Mermaid Events, Kochi.
He has conceived and directed more than 40 international shows, four plays, 80 national cultural events and state pageantries.

He was the creative director for the 35th National Games of India 2015 held in Kerala, opening and closing ceremonies.

He conceived and directed Sentimental Celluloid, the signature film for the 22nd International Film Festival (!FFK) 2017.

Early life

His only brother TK Sajeev Kumar, visual editor at Kerala Kaumudi and is the chief editor of flash movies published by Kerala Kaumudi group. Sajeev Kumar T.K has been re-appointed as Society for News Design regional director for Asia and South Pacific. He runs a website, www.newspaperdesign.in, about news designing in India and the neighboring countries.

He is closely related to the family of renowned Nadaswaram performers Ambalapuzha Brothers. His talents were identified early by Sri. Ramunni (lead actor of Aravindan's Kumatty), the younger brother of Ambalapuzha brothers. Sri. Ramunni took the initiative and he was made the disciple of Ghattom exponent Alleppey Prabhu; under him he started lessons on the percussion instrument mridangam at an early age. He continued his mridangam studies later with renowned percussionist Mavelikkara SR Raju in Trivandrum. During his college days in Government Arts College, Trivandrum, Professor Aliyar Kunju gave exposure to university youth festivals, theatre productions and film societies. 
Advertising filmmaker Mathew Paul introduced him to Jijo and Jose of Navodaya films. 
The former general manager of the State Bank of Travancore, Sri: Sreenivasan, gave him support to become a filmmaker.

Background
TK Rajeev Kumar was born on 20 September 1961 in the Thazhathupurrakal family, Thirunaekkara, Tekkumgopuram in Kottayam district, Kerala. His school education started from Baker Kindergarten School, Kottayam (1966–1970) and continued in MT seminary high school (1971–1972) followed by SDV School, Alleppey (1973–1975) and in MT seminary high school (1971–1972 and 1976), Kottayam. His college studies started at Government Arts College, Trivandrum (1976–1978) and he graduated from University College, Thiruvananthapuram (1978–1982). He was a student of Kerala Law Academy Law College, Thiruvananthapuram from 1982.

During his studies, he joined State Bank of Travancore, Kottyam Main Branch. He started his Malayalam film career as an assistant director with the Navodaya Production Company at the age of 19. He had his lessons from the filmmaker Jijo Punnose, son of Navodaya Appachan. He was lucky to associate with Jijo Punnose in the making of India's first 3D film, My dear Kuttichathan (My dear Chotta Chaetan).
He was associated with Regunath Paleri in his debut directorial venture Onnu Muthal Poogyam Varae produced by Navodaya Production Company. His debut film was Chanakyan which featured Kamal Haasan and Urmila Matondkar starring alongside Jayaram. After his debut film, he got associated with the making of Bible ke Khaniya (Stories from Bible) produced by Navodaya for Doordarshan in 1990–1993. He was signed by Kamalhassan to direct a period film in Tamil written by renowned writer Sujatha in 1990, which never took off due to budget constraints. While he was with State Bank Of Travancore, Sri. Sreenivasan, then general manager, supported his cultural inclinations and special permissions were given to him for directing his debut film Chanakyan.  The bank authorities were supportive but the rules never permitted them to protect Rajeev's services in the bank. He left State Bank of Travancore, when he was associated with SBT Zonal Office, Trivandrum in early nineties.

Filmography

Feature films

Short films
 1994. Advertisement for Colombo Umbrellas, 30 seconds
 1995: Awareness spot – Zoo Watch, 1 minute
 1998: Documentary – Green City, Clean City, 20 minutes for Trivandrum Corporation
 1999: Documentary – Flavours of Kerala, 23 minutes, video documentary in English on cuisines of Kerala
 1999: Corporate film – Astamudi Resorts
 2000: Advertisement – Astamudi Resorts
 2000: Short film – A Cot to Gain or a Tree to Lose, 10 minutes, Malayalam
 2003: Advertisement for Milma, 1 minute, Malayalam
 2004: Road show – 'Palathully' for Malayala Manorama
 2004: Corporate film – Malayala Manorama 'Palathully', 20 minutes, Malayalam and English
 2004: Advertisement – Malayala Manorama 'PALATHULLY' ( rain harvesting), 30 seconds, Malayalam
 2005: Channel's signature film – Amrita Television, 4 minutes
 2006 – Corporate film for Malayala Manorama, presented at the IPDC-UNESCO Prize for Rural Communication, 10 minutes
 2007 – Corporate film for Malatala Manorama
 2008 – Birth of a News Paper for Malayala Manorama
 2009 – Anuyatra – a short film on the late Professor Anandakuttan
 2009 – JT Performing Art Centre Presentation film
 2009 – Traffic Awareness film for Malayala Manorama
 2009 – Choice Marina presentation film
 2010 – Nadaswara Exponents Ambalapuzha Brothers Website Launch
 2011 – Kerala Lottery Onam Bumper Advertisement
 2014 – Ponnayiram – a documentary film based on the 1000 days celebration of Kerala Government
 2014 – Out of the Box – a spot film for Kerala Chief Minister's Facebook page
 2015 – Choice School – a musical album
 2016 – UDF 5th year, a documentary film based on the 5th year celebration of Kerala Government
 2017 – Raag Manirang – documentary on Neyyattinkara Vasudevan for Prd, Government of Kerala.
2017 - Conceived and directed Sentimental Celluloid, the signature film for the 22nd International Film Festival (!FFK) 2017
 2018 – Advertisement for the LDF Government's 3rd year
2018 -  Artistic Director - Mathrubhumi International Festival of Letters ( MBIFL ) 2018, 19 & 20
 2020 – Advertisement for Life Mission, Government of Kerala
 2020 – Unmediated – Documentary on Sashi Kumar, media person for Media Academy, Government of Kerala.
2021 - NAVA KERALA GEETHANJALI - Music video on the Swearing Ceremony of Kerala State Government.
 2022 - Music Album - Tribute to World Cup Football, Qatar ft. Mohanlal

Stage shows
 Star Night led by Bhanu Priya & Super Mimics, stage show across U.A.E., 1990
 Mohanlal and the Magic Lamp, stage show across U.A.E., 1995
 Show '95 organised by the Association of Malayalam Movie Artistes (AMMA), staged at Trivandrum, Cochin and Calicut.
 The stage show in connection with the Miss World Competition held in Bangalore in November 1996 (co-directed with Priyadarshan).
 Arabian Dreams, stage show that travelled across the Middle East starring Suresh Gopi and other Malayalam stars, 1997
 Utsav, stage show that travelled across USA, starring Mohan Lal, Shobana and other stars, 2000
 Yesudas, musical evening, Dubai, 2000
 Samskara, mega cultural show held in connection with the inauguration of the Kerala Travel Mart at Kochi, 2000
 A Fairy Tale, stage show that travelled across the Middle East starring top Malayalam stars, 2001
 Inaugural ceremony – Bhava Rasa – Global Investors' Meet, Cochin, 2003
 Gandharva Sandhya musical events as a tribute to Sri. Yesudas
 Asianet Film Award function from 2000 to 2004
 State Film Awards & Television Awards function – 2000–2004
 Conceived and directed 75 Years of Malayalam Film Music Mega Event 2005
 Kathayattom, stage show in connection with 100 years of Malayalam novels with Mohanlal for Malayala Manorama 2003–2005
 Amrita Television channel launch 2005
 Velli Thiramala, a musical event at Dubai for Malayala Manorama 2006
 Bhavayami, a musical event at Dubai for Malayala Manorama 2007
 Jai Hind Television launch 2007
 Pranayapoorvam, a musical event at Dubai for Malayala Manorama 2008
 Bheemam, play based on MT Vasudevan Nair's Randamoozham 2009
 Anuyatra, music album launch, 2009
 Lal Saalam – 30 years of Mohanlal – musical travelogue, Dubai
 Nannipoorvam Mohanlal, Trivandrum
 Sree Ragam, felicitating MG Sreekumar, Dubai, 2010
 Chitra Pournami, 25 years of K. S. Chitra's singing career, Trivandrum 2011
 Swarna Kamalam 2010 – felicitating Kamal Haasan, Government of Kerala
 Onam Pagentary 2010
 Chitra Pournami 2011 – celebration on completion of famous singer K. S. Chitra's 30 years of musical career.
 Dhanti TV 2013 – celebrating 100 years of Indian cinema, Dubai
 Mazhavil Azhakil Amma 2013 – celebrating 100 years of Indian cinema, Sharjah, U..A.E, and Kochi
 Kerala Film Producer's Association & Matrix Media Pearl Awards 2013 – celebrating 80 years of Malayalam cinema, Doha
 Excellence Awards 2013 – Kerala Cricket Association, Calicut
 Closing ceremony of International Film Festival of Kerala 2013
35th National Games of India, opening and closing ceremonies, "Bhava Rasa & Rivers of India", 2015
 Credai, Trivandrum – event Vayali Bamboo Music
 Conceived and directed Nadanam Venu Layam, celebrating 40 years of Nedumudi Venu's acting career
 Pancha Bhootha, show by AMMA for Asianet 2018 at Abu Dhabi
 Deva Bhoomika, a choreographed show lead by Asha Sharreth, 2019
 Mohanlalum Koottukaarum, event in Dubai for Janmabhoomi 2019
 Lalonam, Asianet Onam event 2020
 Nava Kerala Geethanjali, Kerala Government swearing-in ceremony 2021

Awards
Kerala University Youth Festival award for Best Monact performer – 1978–1980

Kerala Sangeetha Nataka Academy award for Best Monoact Performance – 1980

All India One Act play, Pune 1981, Best Actor

Chanakyan
 Kerala Film Critics Award for the Debut Director 1989
 Filmfare for Best Malayalam Film
 Filmfans Award for Best Director

Pavithram
Filmfare Award for Best Actor – Mohanlal
Film Fans award for Best Film

Kannuyezhuthi Pottum Thottu
National Film Award – Best Actress Manju Warrier (special Jury Award)
Jalamarmaram
National Award for Best Environmental Film 2000
National Award for Best Child Artiste – Ashwin 2000
Kerala State Film Award for Second Best Film 2000
Kerala State Film Awards 2000 Best Screenplay award shared with B. Unnikrishnan
Gulf Malayalee Best Film Award 2000
Selected to the Milan Festival (MIFF 2000), Cairo Festival 2000, Euro-Shorts 2000, Hazel Wolf Environmental Film Festival (2001), Toronto Environmental Film Festival (2001) and Cornell Environmental Film Festival (2001)
Shesham
Kerala State Film Award for Best Film 2001
Kerala State Film Award for Best Story 2001
Kerala State Film Award for Best Editing and Sound Recording 2001
Santharam Award for the Best Film and Director 2001
Kerala Film Critics Award for the Best Film. Best Director, Best Actor, Best Actress and Best Sound Recording. 2001
Padmarajan Puraskaram for the Best Film & Director 2001 & Asianet Awards for the Best Screenplay 2001–2002
Mathrubhoomi Award for Best Film 2001
Cinema Express Award for Best Film 2001 – 2002
Kolaambi
 Official Entry to Indian Panorama, International Film Festival of India 2019, Goa,
 National Award winner for Best Lyric Writer 2020
 State Award Winner for Best Female Playback Singer 2020

Palathully, a short film on rain harvesting for Malayala Manorama won the UN International Award for the Best film for Campaign.

References

Sources
 Synopsis of 2 award winning films by Rajeevkumar
http://mathrubhuminews.in/ee/Programs/Episode/13745/songs-from-t-k-rajeev-kumars-movies-chakkarapanthal-ep-102/E
www.yentha.com/.../interview-of-the-week-t-k-rajeev-kumar–forever-in-
www.sify.com/movies/malayalam/interview.php?id=6005465&cid.
www.youtube.com/watch?v=Bvs4raT_cbM
www.youtube.com/watch?v=1qXUbyim8EM
www.youtube.com/watch?v=ZqTzDkavgKI
Kerala Lottery Onam Bumper - T K Rajeev Kumar

External links

 'Cinema of Malayalam' profile

21st-century Indian film directors
Malayalam film directors
Film directors from Kerala
Kerala State Film Award winners
Living people
Malayali people
1961 births
20th-century Indian film directors
Tamil film producers
Telugu film producers
Hindi-language film directors
People from Kottayam district
Malayalam film producers
Malayalam screenwriters
Directors who won the Best Film on Environment Conservation/Preservation National Film Award